The MKT Depot or MKT Railroad Depot is a steam locomotive depot located in Katy, Texas. The Missouri–Kansas–Texas Railroad services commenced railway operations in 1894 and diminished the rail transport service by 1957 for the connection junction at Katy, Texas.

In 2005, the MKT Railroad Museum was relocated to the first street address in Katy, Texas.

See also
Gulf Coast Lines
List of Texas railroads

References

External links
 
 

Katy, Texas
Former railway stations in Texas